Lopham may refer to:

North Lopham
South Lopham